The 2012–13 TSV 1860 Munich season is the 108th season in the club's football history. In 2012–13 the club plays in the 2. Fußball-Bundesliga, the second tier of German football. It is the clubs ninth consecutive season in this league, having played at this level since 2004–05, after it was relegated from the Fußball-Bundesliga in 2004.

The club also takes part in the 2012–13 edition of the DFB-Pokal, the German Cup, where it reached the second round and will face fourth division side Berliner AK 07 next.

Review and events

It is the clubs ninth consecutive season in this league, having played at this level since 2004–05, after it was relegated from the Fußball-Bundesliga in 2004.

The club also takes part in the 2012–13 edition of the DFB-Pokal, the German Cup, where it reached the second round and will face fourth division side Berliner AK 07 next.

Matches

Legend

2. Bundesliga

Table

League table

Results summary

DFB-Pokal

Squad information

Squad and statistics

Sources: 

|}

Transfers

In

Out

Sources

External links
 2012–13 TSV 1860 München season at Weltfussball.de 
 2012–13 TSV 1860 München season at kicker.de 
 2012–13 TSV 1860 München season at Fussballdaten.de 

1860 Munchen
TSV 1860 Munich seasons